Didgori: Land of Sacrificed Knights is a 2009 historical film directed by Nikoloz Khomasuridze. The film was produced by Nikoloz Bartkulashvili and has cinematography by Megan Woeppel and music by David Porchkhidze. The film's art director was Laura A. Garcia with film editing credits belonging to Irakli Dolidze, Lasha Efremidze, Nevin Millan and the director himself.

Plot
Set in Kingdom of Georgia in the early 12th century, the film centers on the Battle of Didgori (1121), in which the Kingdom of Georgia was victorious against the Great Seljuk Empire, allowing the Georgians to cease paying tributes and reclaim Tbilisi.

Cast
Elgudzha Burduli as David IV of Georgia
Nevin Millan as Hugues de Payens
Mika Sakvarelidze as Godfrey de Saint-Omer
Wil Wesley as Walter Gauthier
Drew Taylor as Baldwin II of Jerusalem
Givi Chuguashvili as Ilghazi
Valeri Korshia as Mahmud II of Great Seljuq
Kylie Clay as Sophie
Gega Choquri as Blacksmith Shamshe
Imeda Arabuli as Imeda - Sacrificed Knight
David Chalatashvili as Nikoloz - Sacrificed Knight
Irakli Cholokashvili as Demetre I of Georgia
Levan Khurtsia as David IV's guard
Paata Mkheidze as David IV's guard

See also
List of historical drama films

External links

2009 films
Drama films from Georgia (country)
2000s Georgian-language films
Films set in the 12th century
Films set in Georgia (country)
Films based on actual events
2000s historical films